Lord Cobham can refer to any of several holders of these titles:

Baron Cobham, a title  in the Peerage of England
Viscount Cobham, a title in the Peerage of Great Britain